The Top Dog is a 1918 British silent drama film directed by Arrigo Bocchi and starring Kenelm Foss, Mary Odette and Hayford Hobbs. It was made at Catford Studios.

Cast
 Kenelm Foss as Jerry Perris  
 Mary Odette as Margaret Drum  
 Hayford Hobbs as Dick Drum  
 Charles Vane as Sir Gregory Horne  
 Evelyn Harding as Mademoiselle Cibot  
 Edward O'Neill as The Octopus  
 Douglas Munro as Mr. Margin 
 Bert Wynne as Pedro Medina  
 Clive Currie as Giles

References

Bibliography
 Goble, Alan. The Complete Index to Literary Sources in Film. Walter de Gruyter, 1999.

External links

1918 films
1918 drama films
British silent feature films
British drama films
Films directed by Arrigo Bocchi
Films based on British novels
British black-and-white films
1910s English-language films
1910s British films
Silent drama films